Testifying is the debut album led by jazz organist Larry Young which was recorded in 1960 and released on the New Jazz label.

Reception

The Allmusic site awarded the album 3 stars and stated "Easily recommended to fans of the jazz organ".

Track listing 
All compositions by Larry Young except as indicated
 "Testifying" - 9:52   
 "When I Grow Too Old to Dream" (Oscar Hammerstein II, Sigmund Romberg) - 5:15   
 "Exercise for Chihuahuas"  (Joe Holiday) - 7:34   
 "Falling in Love With Love" (Lorenz Hart, Richard Rodgers) - 5:04   
 "Some Thorny Blues" - 6:20   
 "Wee Dot" (J. J. Johnson) - 7:04   
 "Flamingo" (Edmund Anderson, Ted Grouya) - 5:23

Personnel 
Larry Young - organ 
Joe Holiday - tenor saxophone (tracks 3 & 7)
Thornel Schwartz - guitar 
Jimmie Smith - drums

References 

Larry Young (musician) albums
1960 debut albums
New Jazz Records albums
Albums recorded at Van Gelder Studio
Albums produced by Esmond Edwards